The Salute of the Jugger (also released as The Blood of Heroes in the United States) is a 1989 Australian-American post-apocalyptic film written and directed by David Webb Peoples, produced by Charles Roven, and starring Rutger Hauer, Joan Chen, and Vincent D'Onofrio. The film has inspired the creation of the sport Jugger.

Plot
In a barren world caused by wars waged in the 20th century and now forgotten, most live from hand to mouth in enclaves known as "market-towns" or "dog-towns", scrounging out a bare subsistence harvesting hardy crops, raising dogs as food, and trading in trinkets from the past.

What little entertainment exists comes primarily from a brutal sport known as The Game. It is played by bands of roving teams known as juggs, who challenge local teams.  They might be considered professional athletes, as they make their living through the tribute paid by the town people, should they defeat the local team. Their trophy is the dog skull from the town. The Game involves two armoured teams of five attempting to score by placing a dog skull on the opposing team's goalpost. One unarmed player—the "quick"—runs with the skull while being protected by his/her teammates from attack by the opposing team.

However, not all in this time live so sparsely.  The Nine Cities, buried deep underground, are home to affluent and powerful members of the aristocracy.  Each of The Nine Cities fields its own team of juggs in an organization known as The League, and its membership is maintained with a fresh stream of new players who are proven veterans of the travelling "dog-town" games by their collection of trophy skulls.

Members of The League live in luxury almost equal to that of aristocrats.  It is a dream among roving juggs to be good enough to get The League's attention and, with it, all of the luxuries afforded a League player.

The team consists of Sallow (Rutger Hauer), Dog-Boy (Justin Monjo), Mbulu (Delroy Lindo), Big Cimber (Anna Katarina), and Young Gar (Vincent D'Onofrio).

Sallow, the team leader, has played in the League of the Nine Cities before, but was cast out because of his indiscretions with an Overlord's daughter. Kidda (Joan Chen), an ambitious peasant girl, joins the team after a game in her dog town where she virtually destroyed her competition. She and Gar inspire Sallow to challenge The League and expunge his past.

But Kidda and Gar do not realise that the City games are for much more than honour and victory, they will need to fight for their very survival.  The Game is played much harder and meaner in the Nine Cities.

Cast
 Rutger Hauer as Sallow                           
 Joan Chen as Kidda
 Vincent D'Onofrio as Gar
 Delroy Lindo as Mbulu
 Anna Katarina as Big Cimber
 Justin Monjo as Dog-Boy
 Hugh Keays-Byrne as Lord  Vile
 Max Fairchild as Gonzo
 Gandhi MacIntyre as Gandhi
 Richard Norton as Bone
 Lia Francisa as Mara
 Steve Rackman as Samchin Jugger

Production

The Salute of the Jugger was shot in the desert of Coober Pedy, Australia.

Alternate cuts
The US theatrical version of the film was significantly shorter than the original version released overseas. About ten minutes were cut. The biggest difference is in the ending. In the American release, the credits roll shortly after the climax, even though picture continues to roll, showing certain conversations with music covering the dialogue. In the longer cut, there are denouement scenes.

The US DVD release of the film matches the US theatrical cut in being much shorter than the original film. Full versions were released on VHS in the early 1990s in Australia, the United Kingdom, Europe and Japan. Various distributors began releasing the original cut on DVD in early 2001, known as the extended version or by the title "Salute to the Jugger".

In 2017, a 2-disc Blu-ray set with both cuts of the film was released in Japan.

See also
 Quintet (film)

References

External links
 
Salute of the Jugger at Oz Movies
 
 

1989 films
1989 directorial debut films
1989 science fiction films
1980s English-language films
1980s science fiction action films
1980s sports films
American post-apocalyptic films
American science fiction action films
American sports drama films
Australian post-apocalyptic films
Australian science fiction action films
Australian sports drama films
Films about competitions
Films about death games
Films produced by Charles Roven
Films shot in South Australia
Films with screenplays by David Peoples
1980s American films